Sevanti Ninan is an Indian journalist, columnist, researcher and media critic. She is the founding editor of The Hoot, which was the first media watchdog in India. Ninan was the recipient of the Chameli Devi Jain Award for Outstanding Women Mediapersons in 1989, and is a visiting scholar (fellowship) at the Center for the Advanced Study of India, an academic center associated with the University of Pennsylvania. She is also the author of the book, Headlines from the Heartland which is described as the first in-depth study into the growth of the expanding Hindi language newspaper industry in India.

Ninan is a regular columnist at The Telegraph and has formerly been a columnist at several major newspapers including The Hindu, The Indian Express and Mint, the financial newspaper founded by The Wall Street Journal and Hindustan Times. She began her career in journalism at the Hindustan Times and subsequently became a correspondent and later an editor with The Indian Express. In 2001, she founded The Hoot as a media watchdog which was re-configured into an archive and media research resource around 2018.

Bibliography 

 Rajasthan (1980) Roli Books. .
 Through the Magic Window: Television and Change in India (1995) Penguin Books. .
 Plain Speaking with Chandrababu Naidu (2000) Viking Press. .
 Headlines from the Heartland: Reinventing the Hindi Public Sphere (2007) SAGE Publications. .

References

Living people
Indian women journalists
Indian columnists
Year of birth missing (living people)